The Rats is a 1921 German silent drama film directed by Hanns Kobe and starring Emil Jannings, Lucie Höflich, and Eugen Klöpfer. It is based on the 1911 play The Rats by Gerhart Hauptmann. It premiered in Berlin on 29 July 1921. The play was later adapted into a 1955 film.

The film's art direction was by Robert Neppach.

Cast

References

Bibliography

External links

1921 films
1921 drama films
Films of the Weimar Republic
German silent feature films
German drama films
Films based on works by Gerhart Hauptmann
German films based on plays
German black-and-white films
Terra Film films
Silent drama films
1920s German films
1920s German-language films